Rocked, Wired & Bluesed: The Greatest Hits is a compilation album released by American rock band Cinderella in 2005, featuring tracks from their entire catalog.

Track listing 
All songs written and arranged by Tom Keifer except, "If You Don't Like It" and "Hot and Bothered", by Keifer and Eric Brittingham.

 "Night Songs" – 4:12
 "Shake Me" – 3:44
 "Nobody's Fool" 4:47
 "Somebody Save Me" – 3:16
 "Bad Seamstress Blues / Fallin' Apart at the Seams" – 5:21
 "Gypsy Road" – 4:01
 "Don't Know What You Got (Till It's Gone)" – 5:54
 "The Last Mile" – 3:51
 "Long Cold Winter" – 5:21
 "If You Don't Like It" – 4:14
 "Coming Home" – 4:54
 "The More Things Change" – 4:21
 "Shelter Me" – 4:47
 "Heartbreak Station" – 4:28
 "Winds of Change" – 5:34
 "Blood from a Stone" – 4:50
 "Hot and Bothered" – 3:56

Personnel
Tom Keifer – lead vocals, electric guitar, 12 and 6-string acoustic guitars, steel guitar, dobro, piano, harmonica
Jeff LaBar – guitar, slide guitar, background vocals
Eric Brittingham – bass, 12-string bass, background vocals
Fred Coury – drums, percussion, background vocals

References

2005 greatest hits albums
Mercury Records compilation albums
Cinderella (band) compilation albums